Nieuwediep is a village in the Dutch province of Drenthe. It is a part of the municipality of Aa en Hunze, and lies about 20 km east of Assen.

The village was first mentioned in 1913 as Nieuwe diep (Het), and means "new canal". It can be used both for the canal and the village. The canal was dug in the middle of the 19th century to excavate the peat in the area. The school in the village closed down in 1995, and is currently in use as village house.

Gallery

References

Populated places in Drenthe
Aa en Hunze